Abdul Hai Arifi (1898–27 March 1986) was a Pakistani  Muslim scholar and a Sufi mentor of the Chishti order. He was a disciple of Ashraf Ali Thanwi. He authored books including Uswah Rasool-e-Akram and Death and Inheritance. He served as the president of Darul Uloom Karachi for ten years. 

Arifi was an alumnus of Muhammadan Anglo-Oriental College and the University of Lucknow. He practiced law between 1926 and 1935, and homeopathy from 1936 until he died on 27 March 1986. His students in Sufism include Muhammad Taqi Usmani and Muhammad Rafi Usmani.

Biography
Abdul Hai Arifi was born in 1898 in United Provinces of British India. He graduated from Muhammadan Anglo-Oriental College in 1923 and got an LLB degree from the University of Lucknow. He practiced law between 1926 and 1935. He left the field of law and studied Homeopathy in 1936. He practiced homeopathic medicine until his death. He had been in touch with Ashraf Ali Thanwi from 1923, and became his "murid" in 1927. Thanwi authorized him in the Chishti order in 1935. 

Arifi was a member of the executive council of Darul Uloom Karachi and succeeded Muhammad Shafi Deobandi as the president of Darul Uloom Karachi and served the seminary for about ten years until his death. He died on 27 March 1986. His funeral prayer was led by Muhammad Taqi Usmani and attended by Muhammad Zia-ul-Haq and Jahan Dad Khan.
 He was buried in the graveyard of Darul Uloom Karachi. His disciples include Muhammad Taqi Usmani and Muhammad Rafi Usmani.

Literary works
Arifi authored books including:
 Uswah Rasool-e-Akram
 Death and Inheritance
 Ashraf Ali Thanvi, life & works
 The Islamic way in death: an authentic and comprehensive handbook of rules, and conduct in the event of death among Muslim
 Maʼās̲ir-i Ḥakīmulummat : irshādāt va ifādāt
 K̲h̲avātīn ke sharʻī aḥkām
 Fihrist-i taʼlīfāt-i Ḥakīmulummat
 Bahādur Yār Jang Akādmī kā taʻāruf

Legacy
Muhammad Rafi Usmani wrote Mere murshid Ḥaẓrat-i ʻĀrifī and Sayyid Riyazuddin wrote Ārif Billāh Ḥaz̤rat Ḍākṭar Muḥammad ʻAbdulhaʼī: savāniḥ ḥayāt va taʻlīmāt.

References

Citations

Bibliography

 
 
 

1898 births
1986 deaths
Deobandis
Muhammadan Anglo-Oriental College alumni
University of Lucknow alumni
Presidents of Jamia Darul Uloom, Karachi
Darul Uloom Karachi people
Disciples of Ashraf Ali Thanwi